NGC 7544 is a lenticular galaxy located in the constellation Pisces. It was discovered by the astronomer Albert Marth on November 18, 1864.

References

External links 
 

Pisces (constellation)
7544
Lenticular galaxies